Marian Leslie Hobbs (born 18 December 1947) is a New Zealand politician who was a Labour Member of Parliament from 1996 to 2008. She was initially a list MP and then (from 1999) represented the  electorate. She served as Minister for the Environment and, later, as one of two Assistant Speakers of the House of Representatives. She represented the Dunedin constituency of the Otago Regional Council from 2019 to 2021.

Early life
Hobbs was raised in Christchurch and was educated at St Dominic's College, Dunedin. Before entering politics, Hobbs worked as a teacher at Aranui High School and was the principal of Avonside Girls' High School in Christchurch. She helped to establish the Chippenham commune in Christchurch and is by religious affiliation a Friend (Quaker). In 1993, Hobbs was awarded the New Zealand Suffrage Centennial Medal.

After leaving school, Hobbs renounced her Catholic beliefs, later becoming a Quaker. At university she was a student radical and joined the Communist Party. Hobbs marched with HART in the 1981 Springbok tour to oppose Apartheid. After the tour she developed a strong interest in Māori issues and became fluent in the language. In May 1996, she was offered the position of principal of Wellington Girls' College, but never ended up taking the job, instead moving into Parliament on the Labour list.

Member of Parliament 

Hobbs stood unsuccessfully in the 1994 Selwyn by-election where she came a distant third. Upon entering parliament Hobbs was designated opposition spokesperson for broadcasting, communications and information technology by leader Helen Clark.

Hobbs was selected as Labour candidate for the seat over Victoria University dean of law Professor Brian Brooks, teacher Elaine Whelan and former Wellington City Councillor Hazel Armstrong. In the 1999 election, Hobbs won the Wellington Central electorate, defeating the incumbent member, ACT Party leader Richard Prebble.

Cabinet minister
After Labour's electoral victory in 1999, Hobbs joined the Cabinet, becoming Minister for the Environment, Minister of Biosecurity, Minister of Broadcasting, and Minister Responsible for the National Library of New Zealand and Archives New Zealand. In February 2001, she briefly resigned from Cabinet while an enquiry investigated her allowance-claims; she returned in late March after receiving official clearance.

As Minister of Broadcasting, Hobbs set a code of practice for New Zealand commercial radio, specifying that 20 percent of music played should have New Zealand origins.

Following the 2002 general election, Hobbs continued as the Minister for the Environment and Minister Responsible for the National Library and Archives New Zealand, and picked up new roles as Minister of Disarmament and Arms Control, Associate Minister of Foreign Affairs and Trade with responsibility for Official Development Assistance, Associate Minister for Biosecurity, Associate Minister of Education, and Minister Responsible for Urban Affairs.

Resignation from Cabinet
In 2004, Hobbs told Prime Minister Helen Clark that she did not expect to seek a post in Cabinet again after the 2005 general election. Hobbs contested the election and was returned to the Wellington Central electorate with a 6,180 majority over the National Party candidate, Mark Blumsky. She made her decision about not seeking a Cabinet role public during the negotiations to form a government in October 2005.

After resigning from Cabinet, Hobbs served briefly as Labour's party Vice-President and became the Assistant Speaker of the House in March 2008, after Ann Hartley resigned.

In December 2006 Hobbs announced (during a radio interview) that she would not seek re-election at the 2008 general election, confirming much speculation to that effect. She was succeeded in Wellington Central by Grant Robertson, who had worked for her while she was a minister.

Post-Parliamentary career 
Before leaving Parliament, Hobbs signalled her intention to work as a teacher in the United Kingdom, in compensation for never having made a traditional working-holiday as a young woman. She spent two years as the Headteacher at Prince William School in Oundle, Northamptonshire, United Kingdom.

Hobbs stood as a Labour candidate for the Otago Regional Council at the 2019 local elections and was successful. On 23 October, she was elected as chair, with Michael Laws as her deputy. In a vote on 8 July 2020, she lost the role and was replaced by councillor Andrew Noone. She resigned from the council on 1 November 2021.

Personal life
Hobbs had one son, Daniel, with her first husband Walter Logeman. Her second marriage was to maths teacher Geoff Norris with whom she unexpectedly had a daughter, Claire.

Her father was Leslie Hobbs, a political journalist, who wrote The Thirty-Year Wonders, a history of the First and Second Labour Governments and their members.

See also
Contents of the United States diplomatic cables leak (New Zealand)

References

1947 births
Living people
New Zealand communists
New Zealand Labour Party MPs
Members of the Cabinet of New Zealand
New Zealand Quakers
Women government ministers of New Zealand
New Zealand list MPs
People educated at Trinity Catholic College, Dunedin
New Zealand MPs for Wellington electorates
Members of the New Zealand House of Representatives
21st-century New Zealand politicians
21st-century New Zealand women politicians
Women members of the New Zealand House of Representatives
Recipients of the New Zealand Suffrage Centennial Medal 1993
Otago regional councillors